The Battle of the Port of Carthage was a naval battle of the Third Punic War fought in 147 BC between the Carthaginians and the Roman Republic.

In the summer of 147 BC, during the Siege of Carthage, the Roman fleet, under the command of Lucius Hostilius Mancinus kept a close watch on the city from the sea. His warships were reinforced that same year by the forces of Scipio Aemilianus. The Carthaginians managed to find an escape route to the sea that had not been effectively blockaded by the Roman navy and put their fleet of 50 triremes and smaller numbers of other vessels to sea to confront the invading fleet. They engaged the Roman fleet outside the Port of Carthage, and met with initial success in repulsing the Roman attacks to their ships, inflicting heavy casualties on them. As the battle progressed, the Carthaginians decided to return to port. During this operation, the smaller ships of the Carthaginian fleet blockaded the entrance to the port, forcing the Roman vessels very close into shallower waters. 

Some of the smaller Carthaginian vessels were sunk, but at dawn, a majority had made it successfully back to port. This victory for the Carthaginian navy was not enough to break the blockade by the Roman navy.

See also 
 Punic Wars

References 

 
Appian of Alexandria, The Punic Wars, "The Third Punic War"

147 BC
Carthage

Carthage